Friedrich Weber may refer to:

 Friedrich Weber (veterinarian) (1892–1954), German veterinarian; a principal conspirator in the Beer Hall Putsch
 Friedrich Weber (entomologist) (1781–1823), German entomologist and botanist
 Friedrich Weber (general) (1892–1972), German general
 Friedrich Wilhelm Weber (1813–1894), German doctor, politician and poet
 Friedrich Christian Weber, 18th-century German diplomat and writer
 Friedrich Dionys Weber (1766–1842), Bohemian composer
 Friedrich Weber (musician) (1819–1909), German organist and composer

See also
 Weber